The Railway Vehicle Preservation Society (Gesellschaft zur Erhaltung von Schienenfahrzeugen e.V. or GES) is one of the oldest societies in Germany that runs a museum railway. The headquarters of the GES is in Stuttgart.

Formation 
The society was founded on 8 December 1965 by a group of tramway fans within the so-called Verkehrsfreunde Stuttgart society, that had signed up for the preservation and care of the last remaining railcar, no. 126, from the former Filderbahn as well as other historically valuable trams. After the Stuttgart Tram Company (Stuttgarter Straßenbahnen or SSB) had shown no interest in building up a museum collection and the Filderbahn railcar 126 could only be preserved by keeping it at Ludwigsburg, the GES turned at the end of the 1960s to the more promising theme of opening a railway. The engagement of the GES for the preservation and subsequent restoration of the Filderbahn wagon laid the foundation stone for the present-day collection of the Stuttgarter Historische Straßenbahnen.

Timetable 
The GES runs regular museum railway operations using the historical train consists Feuriger Elias ('Fiery Elias') and Sofazügle (literally: 'Little Sofa Train'). Due to the ban on steam locomotives issued by the Deutsche Bundesbahn between 1977 and 1985 the operations were restricted to private railway lines on the Strohgäubahn from Korntal-Münchingen to Weissach or the Tälesbahn between Nürtingen and Neuffen. The trains continue to have this as their there today. To begin with, special trips were also run on the WEG routes from Enz Nord to Enzweihingen and, up to 1982, on the Filderbahn between Stuttgart-Möhringen, Stuttgart-Vaihingen, Leinfelden and Neuhausen auf den Fildern. From 1985 specials were also offered on other routes in the Stuttgart area.

Hohenzollern train 

The GES has a cultural monument to the state of Baden-Württemberg: the Hohenzollern train. It comprises vehicles that were operated by the Hohenzollern Branch Line Company (Hohenzollerischen Kleinbahn Gesellschaft, from 1907 the Hohenzollerische Landesbahn). The majority of these are deployed in museum railway services on the Tälesbahn as part of the Sofazügle.

List of vehicles

Tourist train vehicles 

The GES is working on restoring a Württemberg T 3 (K.W.St.E no. 930 and DRG no. 89 363).

References and Footnotes

External links 

 Homepage
 Homepage des Vereins Stuttgarter Historische Straßenbahnen (SHB) e.V.
 There is an English-language discussion forum at Railways of Germany

Railway museums in Germany
History of rail transport in Baden-Württemberg
Museums in Stuttgart